Pestszentimre is neighborhood of Pestszentlőrinc-Pestszentimre in the city of Budapest, Hungary.

Pestszentlőrinc-Pestszentimre